Count Theodore Béla Rudolf Zichy de Zich et Vásonkeő (13 June 1908 – 30 December 1987) was a British actor, photographer, film director, producer and playboy of Hungarian descent.

Early life
Born in Eastbourne in Sussex in 1908, the son of Count Béla Mária Rudolf Zichy de Zich et Vásonkeő (1868–1944), a Hungarian aristocrat, and an American mother, Mabel Elizabeth Wright (1865–1926), his brother was Edward George Béla Mária Zichy de Zich et Vásonkeő (1898–1958). A great-nephew of Mihály Zichy, Theodore Zichy held British and Hungarian citizenship.

Career
In 1928, he started racing Bugattis, which he continued on and off until 1932.

He learned to fly at Brooklands in the late 1930s, owned a de Havilland Puss Moth registered G-AAXY and kept this at Brooklands from 1938 to 1939 and served in the Air Transport Auxiliary as a First Officer from 1940 to 1941. Some forty years later, he recalled his experiences as a ferry pilot in various articles published in Aeroplane Monthly magazine.

As a photographer he mainly took pictures of women's legs, feet and shoes. His 1948 photograph portfolio Chiaroscuros (from the Italian "chiaroscuro") contained images of foot and shoe fetishism. In the mid-1950s he worked as a photographer for Baron Studios in London. His autobiography That Was No Gentleman, That Was Zichy was published in 1974.

Film career
As an actor Zichy appeared as 2nd in Command in Gasbags (1941), Colonel Borg in The Life and Death of Colonel Blimp (1943), as the Duel Referee in the TV movie Liebelei (1954), and as a German Agent in Private's Progress (1956).

Later, he directed and produced the shorts Death Was a Passenger (1958), Portrait of a Matador (1958) and Mingaloo (1958), also writing the latter, as well as directing and producing the films Night Without Pity (1961) and Doomsday at Eleven (1963). He produced the film Bomb in the High Street (1961).

Personal life
On 20 February 1928, he married Xenia V. Howard Johnston (1904–1931) in Paris, France; the couple divorced in 1930. In 1964 he married Daphne Barker (previously of the Jack and Daphne Barker Cabaret duo) in London and stayed married to her until her death in 1987.

Count Theodore Zichy committed suicide at home, 8 Sandwich Street, Bloomsbury, London WC1 on 30 December 1987. His death certificate was issued in 1988.

References

External links
 Examples of Zichy's Fetish Photography – Neutral Density Magazine
 Photographs by Zichy for Baron Studios – National Portrait Gallery
 Photographic portrait of Zichy (1960) – National Portrait Gallery
 Zichy on the British Film Institute website

1908 births
1987 deaths
Suicides in Bloomsbury
Theodore
English male film actors
Photographers from Sussex
English film directors
English film producers
English people of Hungarian descent
20th-century British male actors
English people of American descent
People from Eastbourne
1987 suicides
20th-century English businesspeople
Air Transport Auxiliary pilots